Belovo Municipality is a municipality in the Pazardzhik Province of Bulgaria.

Demography

At the 2011 census, the population of Belovo was 8,891. Most of the inhabitants (93.04%) were Bulgarians, and there was a minority of Gypsies/Romani(4.21%). 2.3% of the population's ethnicity was unknown.

Communities

Towns
 Belovo

Villages
 Akandzhievo
 Dabravite
 Gabrovitsa
 Golyamo Belovo
 Menekyovo
 Momina Klisura
 Sestrimo

References

Municipalities in Pazardzhik Province